The 1992 PBA All-Filipino Conference Finals was the best-of-7 basketball championship series of the 1992 PBA All-Filipino Conference, and the conclusion of the conference playoffs. The San Miguel Beermen and Purefoods Tender Juicy Hotdogs played for the 52nd championship contested by the league.

San Miguel Beermen won their 9th PBA title, defeating defending champion Purefoods Tender Juicy Hotdogs in a seven-game series. It was the Beermen's first championship in the 1990s, after winning the Grandslam three years ago.

Qualification

Series scoring summary

Games summary

Game 1

The Beermen took control in the series opener during the second quarter and leads by as much as 14 points in the final period. When the score was standing at 79–66 for San Miguel, Alvin Patrimonio took charge by scoring seven straight points as the Hotdogs close to within six, 73–79. Samboy Lim scored on a layup and clutch baskets by Hector Calma and Ato Agustin sealed the victory.

Game 2

The Hotdogs trailed for most of the game but Alvin Patrimonio pumped in 21 points in the fourth quarter in a come-from-behind Purefoods victory.

Game 3

Purefoods took the first quarter at 27–14, but the Beermen battled back and it was close in the first three quarters. In the fourth period, Alvin Patrimonio's three-point play and Elmer Cabahug's triple gave the Hotdogs a 91–84 lead, they keep answering every baskets made by the Beermen until a 10–2 run by San Miguel in the closing minutes. From a 108–101 count in favor of Purefoods, the Beermen regain the upper hand at 111–110, Ramon Fernandez bungled a pass in the dying seconds that led to Alvin Patrimonio scoring two free throws. In the final play, Fernandez missed on a turn around shot with five seconds remaining, giving Purefoods the win.

Game 4

Purefoods fell behind by 19 points and were down by 14 points, 75–89, going into the final quarter. The Hotdogs rallied to within four, 96–100, mainly on the exploits of Boy Cabahug. The Beermen answered with a 7–0 run, with Ato Agustin scoring on a drive, Yves Dignadice converting a three-point play off a sixth foul by Alvin Patrimonio, and two free throws by Samboy Lim put the game away, 107–96 with 1:58 left.

Game 5

Hector Calma completed a crucial interception with two seconds left as San Miguel escaped with a one-point victory. Calma snatched a pass by Jerry Codinera to a streaking Dindo Pumaren at midline to preserved a near-fatal finish by the Beermen, who went scoreless in the last 2:50. The Hotdogs trailed by as many as 21 points in the second quarter, but battled back behind Boy Cabahug, who scored 35 points, and Alvin Patrimonio. Purefoods forces the Beermen to two 25-second violation in the last 2:50 and Patrimonio and Cabahug translate this San Miguel-fold up into a nine-point blast by the Hotdogs to come within a point, 98–99.

Game 6

San Miguel went ahead by six points in the fourth period, 87–81, and last took a 95–92 lead. Alvin Patrimonio scored 11 straight points going into the last two minutes. The Beermen failed to score in the last 1:05.

Game 7

San Miguel opened the third quarter with Samboy Lim and Ato Agustin providing the points and zoomed to double-digit leads, the last at 70–58 on a triple by Bong Ravena, a 9–2 run by the Hotdogs close the gap to 67–72, going into the last 12 minutes. The Beermen broke the game wide-open in the fourth quarter with a 9–0 blast as Ramon Fernandez converted on a three-point play to give San Miguel an 81–67 lead. Ato Agustin's jumper gave the Beermen their largest margin at 93–74.

Rosters

Broadcast notes

References

External links
PBA official website

1992 PBA season
1992
San Miguel Beermen games
Magnolia Hotshots games
PBA All-Filipino Conference Finals